The Tariat inscriptions appear on a stele found near the Hoid Terhyin River in Doloon Mod district, Arkhangai Province, modern-day Mongolia. (The forms Terkhin and Terhyin are also used). The stele was erected by Bayanchur Khan of the Uyghur Khaganate in the middle of the eighth century (between 753 and 760 CE seems to be the best estimate).

Discovery 

Archeologists already knew of the existence of this stele  because it was mentioned in another Uighur stele found in 1909. But it took 47 years to discover and unearth the stele; finally being found by Mongolian archeologist T. Dorjsuren in 1956. The finds are now exhibited in the Mongolian Institute of Archeology in Ulaanbaatar.

Uighurs

The Uyghur Khaganate replaced the Second Turkic Khaganate in Inner Asia in 745 CE.  Its founder was Kutluk Bilge Köl (745-747). Unlike their predecessors, they were allies of the Tang dynasty and in the early days of the khaganate the khagans (rulers) supported the Tang emperor against the rebellious general An Lushan. They were one of the major powers of Asia. However, in 848 CE they were defeated by the Kyrgyz and were forced to move west to the Gansu and  Xinjiang regions of modern-day China.

The Stele 

The stele had been erected on a bixi or tortoise plinth and is made of light gray granite. There are 30 lines of text inscribed on each side of the stele in old Turkic using the Orkhon alphabet (Turkic runes) which was also used in the famous Khöshöö Tsaidam Monuments of Bilge Khagan and his brother Kül Tigin of the Turkic khaganate in 732 and 735 CE.  The narrator is Bayanchur Khan of the Uighur khaganate who reigned between 747 and 759 CE.

The Narration 

Bayanchor Khan refers to himself as El etmish Bilge Kagan. (Not to be confused with Bilge Kagan of the Turkic Khanate who lived earlier). According to inscriptions appearing on the east side of the slab, during the interregnum following the death of his father, Bayanchor fought against the tribes supporting his elder brother Tay Bilge Tutuk. Among these tribes, the Tatars seem to have been the most important enemy, for their names are mentioned several times.  On the west face of the stele, a brief history of the Turkic peoples is given. It is notable that the names of Bumin Khan and İstemi of the Turkic Khaganate are also mentioned in the inscriptions. This may mean that the power shift from the Turkic Khaganete to the (linguistically indistinguishable) Uighur Khanate was considered merely as a coup d'état.

Complete text

References

Notes

Archaeology of Mongolia
8th-century inscriptions
Uyghur inscriptions
Speeches by heads of state